The 2007 WNBA Season was the Women's National Basketball Association's 11th season. On January 3, 2007 The Charlotte Sting folded. Three months later on April 4, the WNBA held their annual draft in Cleveland, Ohio. Lindsey Harding of Duke University was selected number one by the Phoenix Mercury. The Duke point guard was traded later to the Minnesota Lynx for Tangela Smith. The San Antonio Silver Stars selected Ohio State University center, Jessica Davenport. Davenport was traded to the New York Liberty for Becky Hammon.
The season kicked off on May 19, with a rematch of the 2006 WNBA Finals between the Sacramento Monarchs and the Detroit Shock. The Shock defeated the Monarchs 75-68. On July 15 The All Star Game was played at the Verizon Center in Washington D.C. The Eastern All Stars defeated the Western All Stars 103-99. Detroit Shock center, Cheryl Ford won the MVP of the game. Playing 27 minutes contributing 16 points, 13 rebounds, and 5 assists for the Eastern All Stars victory. The 2007 WNBA regular season ended on August 19. Lauren Jackson of the Seattle Storm was named league MVP. Dan Hughes of the San Antonio Silver Stars was named Coach of the Year. Armintie Price of the Chicago Sky was named Rookie of The Year. The 2007 WNBA season officially ended on September 16 when the Phoenix Mercury won the season WNBA Championship. The Mercury defeated the Detroit Shock 3 games to 2. Mercury guard Cappie Pondexter was named Finals MVP.

Regular season standings
Eastern Conference

Western Conference

Season award winners

Playoffs

Coaches

Eastern Conference
Chicago Sky: Bo Overton
Connecticut Sun: Mike Thibault
Detroit Shock: Bill Laimbeer
Indiana Fever: Brian Winters
New York Liberty: Pat Coyle
Washington Mystics: Richie Adubato and Tree Rollins

Western Conference
Houston Comets: Karleen Thompson
Los Angeles Sparks: Michael Cooper
Minnesota Lynx: Don Zierden
Phoenix Mercury: Paul Westhead
Sacramento Monarchs: Jenny Boucek
San Antonio Silver Stars: Dan Hughes
Seattle Storm: Anne Donovan

External links
 WNBA Statistics at Basketball-Reference.com
 2007 WNBA Final Standings
 2007 WNBA Award Winners
 Charlotte Sting Folding
 2007 WNBA Draft
 First Game of the 2007 season
 2007 WNBA All Star Game
 Cheryl Ford wins All Star MVP

 
2007 in American women's basketball
2006–07 in American basketball by league
2007–08 in American basketball by league
Women's National Basketball Association seasons